Poly Property Group Co., Ltd., is a Hong Kong incorporated Chinese property developer, with its major businesses include property development, investment and management. It mainly develops mid to high-end residential and commercial properties in the cities along Yangtze River Delta and Pearl River Delta as well as the second-tier provincial capitals.

Poly Property is a constituent of Hang Seng China-Affiliated Corporations Index (Red chip index)

He Ping, son of late military officer , and the son-in-law of the former Chinese leader, late Deng Xiaoping, is the former chairman of the company. He Ping was also the chairman of the parent company China Poly Group, which had a military background in the past.

History
The corporate entity of Poly Property was established in 1973, originally as a shipping company called Continental Mariner Investment Company Limited (abb. CMIC). In 1993, China Poly Group Corporation acquired 55% stake in the company and converted its business from shipping to conglomerate, as a reverse IPO. In 2005, CMIC was renamed to Poly (Hong Kong) Investments Limited. In 2012 the company renamed again as Poly Property Group Co., Ltd..

Poly Property entered Hong Kong property market in 2014 by purchasing a land lease "New Kowloon Inland Lot No.6527" in an area formerly belonging to Kai Tak Airport, for HK$3.923 billion. The site was developed into Vibe Centro.

Shareholders
, Poly (Hong Kong) Holdings and its subsidiaries, owned 40.39% shares of the listed company (the subsidiaries are BVI companies Congratulations Co., Ltd., Source Holdings and Ting Shing Holdings respectively). Poly (Hong Kong) Holdings itself is a subsidiary of state-owned China Poly Group; China Poly Group owned an additional 6.93% shares of Poly Property, via mainland China incorporated "Poly Southern Group Co., Ltd.". As Poly Property was incorporated outside mainland China, but controlled by Chinese Central Government indirectly, the company was considered as a red chip.

Charmian Xue Ming and independent non-executive directors: Choy Shu Kwan, Leung Sau Fan (Sylvia Leung) and Wong Ka Lun, also owned negligible number of the shares.

During 2016 financial year, all the bonds were fully redeemed by the company.

See also
 Poly Real Estate, sister company

References

External links
 

Companies listed on the Hong Kong Stock Exchange
Real estate companies of China
Conglomerate companies of China
Government-owned companies of China
Real estate companies established in 1973
1973 establishments in Hong Kong
Holding companies of Hong Kong
Conglomerate companies of Hong Kong
Companies based in Shanghai
China Poly Group